Tonin' is the sixteenth studio album by The Manhattan Transfer. It was released in 1995 on Atlantic Records. The expression "tonin'" is associated with the vocal groups of the 1950s and 1960s. The songs on this album are favorites of the band's from that era. Singer-songwriter Laura Nyro makes one of her last performances on this recording.

Track listing
 "Let's Hang On" (Bob Crewe, Sandy Linzer, Denny Randell) (with Frankie Valli) - 4:41
 "Groovin'" (Eddie Brigati, Felix Cavaliere) (with Felix Cavaliere of The Rascals) - 4:09
 "It's Gonna Take a Miracle" (Teddy Randazzo, Lou Stallman, Bob Weinstein) (with Bette Midler) - 3:56
 "I Second That Emotion" (Al Cleveland, Smokey Robinson) (with Smokey Robinson) - 3:40
 "La-La (Means I Love You)" (Thom Bell, William "Poogie" Hart) (with Laura Nyro) - 4:36
 "Too Busy Thinking About My Baby" (Norman Whitfield, Barrett Strong, Janie Bradford) (with Phil Collins) - 4:44
 "The Thrill Is Gone" (Roy Hawkins, Rick Darnell) (with Ruth Brown and B.B. King) - 6:07
 "Hot Fun in the Summertime" (Sylvester "Sly Stone" Stewart) (with Chaka Khan) - 4:17
 "Along Comes Mary" (Tandyn Almer) - 3:34
 "Dream Lover" (Bobby Darin) (with James Taylor) - 4:53
 "Save The Last Dance For Me" (Doc Pomus, Mort Shuman) (with Ben E. King) - 4:05
 "God Only Knows" (Brian Wilson, Tony Asher) - 2:46

Personnel 
The Manhattan Transfer
 Cheryl Bentyne – backing vocals, lead vocals (5, 8, 11), vocals (12)
 Tim Hauser – backing vocals, vocal arrangements (1, 4, 6, 8, 9), additional arrangements (1), lead vocals (6, 8, 9), vocals (12)
 Alan Paul – backing vocals, vocal arrangements (1, 2, 10, 11), additional arrangements (1), lead vocals (2, 8, 9, 10), arrangements (2, 10), vocals (12)
 Janis Siegel – backing vocals, lead vocals (1, 3, 7, 8), vocal arrangements (3, 4, 5), additional arrangements (8), vocals (12)

Musicians and Guests
 Clay Ostwald – keyboards (1), Synclavier programming (1), arrangements (1), horn arrangements (1)
 Jorgé Casas – Synclavier programming (1), bass (1), arrangements (1), horn arrangements (1)
 Robbie Buchanan – keyboards (2, 3, 5, 8–11), synthesizers (2, 3, 5, 8–11), additional keyboards (10)
 Steve Skinner – programming (2, 4, 6, 8, 9), additional keyboards (2, 8, 11), arrangements (2, 4, 6, 8, 9), keyboards (6)
 Mark Mann – additional programming (2, 3, 8–11)
 Randy Kerber – keyboards (4), synthesizers (4)
 Tom Ranier – additional synthesizers (4)
 Laura Nyro – acoustic piano (5), lead vocals (5), arrangements (5)
 Joe Mardin – programming (5), percussion (5), live drums (6), cymbals (6), hi-hat (6)
 Greg Phillinganes – keyboards (7)
 Robbie Kondor – additional keyboards (9), programming (10, 11), arrangements (10, 11)
 Mike Finnigan – Hammond B3 organ (11)
 Rene Toledo – guitars (1)
 Michael Landau – guitars (2, 3, 8)
 Paul Jackson Jr. – guitar (4, 6)
 Michael Thompson – guitar (4, 9)
 David Spinozza – guitars (5)
 B.B. King – lead guitar (7)
 David Williams – guitar (7)
 Dean Parks – guitar (9, 10, 11)
 Abraham Laboriel – bass (3)
 Neil Stubenhaus – bass (4, 6)
 Will Lee – bass (5)
 Dave Marotta – bass (7)
 Jimmy Johnson – bass (9, 11)
 Mike Porcaro – bass (10)
 Mike Baird – drums (2, 3, 8, 11)
 John Robinson – drums (4, 9)
 Chris Parker – drums (5)
 Harvey Mason – drums (7)
 Carlos Vega – drums (10)
 Edwin Bonila – percussion (1)
 Luis Conte – percussion (1, 2, 8)
 Lenny Castro – percussion (2, 4, 8)
 Paulinho da Costa – percussion (11)
 Chris Hunter – saxophones (1, 4)
 Roger Rosenberg – saxophones (1, 4)
 Joel Peskin – alto saxophone (3), flute (9), tenor saxophone (10)
 Danny Wilensky – tenor saxophone (6)
 Herb Besson – trombone (1, 4)
 Tony Cadlic – trumpet (1, 4)
 Jim Hines – trumpet (1, 4)
 Tommy Morgan – harmonica (2)
 Arif Mardin – string arrangements, horn arrangements  (1), arrangements (2-11), additional vocal arrangements (7, 9)
 Mervyn Warren – vocal arrangements (7, 12), vocal conductor (12)
 Corey Allen – vocal arrangements (8, 9)
 Gene Orloff – concertmaster 
 Frank DeCaro – musical contractor 
 Frankie Valli – lead vocals (1)
 Felix Cavaliere – lead vocals (2)
 Bette Midler – lead vocals (3)
 Smokey Robinson – lead vocals (4)
 Phil Collins – lead vocals (6)
 Ruth Brown – lead vocals (7)
 Chaka Khan – lead vocals (8)
 Ben E. King – lead vocals (10)

Production 
 Arif Mardin – producer
 Michael O'Reilly – recording, remixing 
 Ed Cherney – additional engineer 
 Jack Joseph Puig – additional engineer
 David Richards – additional engineer 
 Jeremy Smith – additional engineer
 Chris Albert – assistant engineer 
 Rich Castey – assistant engineer 
 Matt Curry – assistant engineer 
 Jay Millitsher – assistant engineer 
 Carl Napps – assistant engineer 
 Scott Perry – assistant engineer 
 Marnie Riley – assistant engineer 
 Rail Rogut – assistant engineer 
 Rory Romano – assistant engineer 
 George Marino – mastering 
 Gloria Gabriel – project coordinator 
 Thomas Bricker – art direction 
 Firooz Zahedi – photography 
 Vivian Turner – styling
 Enzo – hair
 Karen Kawahara – make-up 
 Kareen Boursier – grooming 
 Lindsay Scott Management, Inc. – management

Studios
 Recorded at Conway Studios (Hollywood, California); Record One (Sherman Oaks, California); Right Track Recording, The Hit Factory, The Power Station and Unique Recording Studios (New York City, New York); Crescent Moon Studios (Miami, Florida); Mountain Studios (Montreux, Switzerland).
 Remixed at Right Track Recording and The Power Station.
 Mastered at Sterling Sound (New York City, New York).

References
 The Manhattan Transfer Official Website

The Manhattan Transfer albums
1995 albums
Atlantic Records albums